Matías Orlando Fantín (born 21 November 1995) is an Argentine professional footballer who plays as a midfielder for Sarmiento.

Career
Fantín started out in the youth of Sol de Mayo. In 2011, whilst with Unión Santa Fe's academy, he had a trial with Belgian side Anderlecht. In 2013, Fantín made his professional debut on 21 June 2013 during a 3–0 defeat away to Racing Club, which was his only appearance in the 2012–13 Argentine Primera División season which they ended with relegation. In Primera B Nacional, Fantín netted his first goal for the club as they drew at home to Banfield on 6 June. Two further appearances came across the next six campaigns, before the midfielder left on loan to play for Santamarina on 30 June 2018.

At the end of 2018, Fantín stood without contract after leaving Santamarina after his loan contract expired; just as his contract with Unión Santa Fe did. In January 2019, Fantín joined Colón de San Justo in Torneo Regional Federal Amateur. One goal in eight appearances followed. In mid-2020, Fantín signed for Sarmiento of Torneo Federal A.

Career statistics
.

References

External links

1995 births
Living people
Sportspeople from Chaco Province
Argentine footballers
Association football midfielders
Argentine Primera División players
Primera Nacional players
Unión de Santa Fe footballers
Club y Biblioteca Ramón Santamarina footballers
Sarmiento de Resistencia footballers